The 2017 Lucas Oil 150 was the 22nd stock car race of the 2017 NASCAR Camping World Truck Series, the fifth race of the 2017 NASCAR Camping World Truck Series playoffs, the third and final race of the Round of 6, and the 23rd iteration of the event. The race was held on Friday, November 10, 2017, in Avondale, Arizona at Phoenix International Raceway, a 1-mile (1.6 km) permanent low-banked tri-oval race track. The race took the scheduled 150 laps to complete. On the final restart with seven to go, GMS Racing driver Johnny Sauter would come out victorious in a battle with eventual second-place finisher, NEMCO Motorsports driver John Hunter Nemechek, to win his 17th career NASCAR Camping World Truck Series win and his fourth and final win of the season. To fill out the podium, Cody Coughlin of ThorSport Racing would finish third. 

Meanwhile, the four drivers to make the Championship 4 round were: Christopher Bell, Johnny Sauter, Matt Crafton, and Austin Cindric.

Background 

Phoenix International Raceway – also known as PIR – is a one-mile, low-banked tri-oval race track located in Avondale, Arizona. It is named after the nearby metropolitan area of Phoenix. The motorsport track opened in 1964 and currently hosts two NASCAR race weekends annually. PIR has also hosted the IndyCar Series, CART, USAC and the Rolex Sports Car Series. The raceway is currently owned and operated by International Speedway Corporation.

The raceway was originally constructed with a 2.5 mi (4.0 km) road course that ran both inside and outside of the main tri-oval. In 1991 the track was reconfigured with the current 1.51 mi (2.43 km) interior layout. PIR has an estimated grandstand seating capacity of around 67,000. Lights were installed around the track in 2004 following the addition of a second annual NASCAR race weekend.

Entry list 

 (R) denotes rookie driver.
 (i) denotes driver who is ineligible for series driver points.

Practice 
The only practice session was held on Friday, November 10, at 9:00 AM MST. The session would last for one hour and 50 minutes.

Qualifying 
Qualifying was held on Friday, November 10, at 3:30 PM MST. Since Phoenix International Raceway is under 1.5 miles (2.4 km) in length, the qualifying system was a multi-car system that included three rounds. The first round was 15 minutes, where every driver would be able to set a lap within the 15 minutes. Then, the second round would consist of the fastest 24 cars in Round 1, and drivers would have 10 minutes to set a lap. Round 3 consisted of the fastest 12 drivers from Round 2, and the drivers would have 5 minutes to set a time. Whoever was fastest in Round 3 would win the pole.

No drivers would fail to qualify.

Full qualifying results 

*Time not available.

Race results 
Stage 1 Laps: 40

Stage 2 Laps: 40

Stage 3 Laps: 70

Standings after the race 

Drivers' Championship standings

Note: Only the first 8 positions are included for the driver standings.

References 

2017 NASCAR Camping World Truck Series
NASCAR races at Phoenix Raceway
November 2017 sports events in the United States
2017 in sports in Arizona